, also known as , was a Japanese waka poet of the late-Heian period. One of his poems was included in the Ogura Hyakunin Isshu. He produced a private collection, the Rin'yō Wakashū, and was listed as one of the Late Classical Thirty-Six Immortals of Poetry.

Name 
His Buddhist name is also read Sun'e, and he is also known by the name Tayū no Kimi.

Biography 
He was born in 1113, the son of Minamoto no Toshiyori. His maternal grandfather was Fujiwara no Atsutaka.  He was tutored in waka composition by his father, but after the latter died he appears to have taken monastic orders in Tōdai-ji.  His exact date of death is uncertain, but it was likely around 1191.

Poetry 
Eighty-three of his poems were included in imperial anthologies, and he was recognized as one of the Late Classical Thirty-Six Immortals of Poetry.

He was a poetic mentor to Kamo no Chōmei.

The following poem by him was included as No. 85 in Fujiwara no Teika's Ogura Hyakunin Isshu:

References

Citations

Works cited 

 
McMillan, Peter. 2010 (1st ed. 2008). One Hundred Poets, One Poem Each. New York: Columbia University Press.
 
Suzuki Hideo, Yamaguchi Shin'ichi, Yoda Yasushi. 2009 (1st ed. 1997). Genshoku: Ogura Hyakunin Isshu. Tokyo: Bun'eidō.

External links 
List of Shun'e's poems in the International Research Center for Japanese Studies's online waka database.
Rin'yō-shū in the same database.
Shun'e on Kotobank.

12th century in Japan
12th-century Japanese poets
1113 births
People of Heian-period Japan
Japanese Buddhist clergy
Articles containing Japanese poems
Hyakunin Isshu poets
Year of death missing
Heian period Buddhist clergy